José Rafael Hernández (born 26 June 1997) is a Venezuelan footballer who plays as a left back for Universidad Central.

Club career

Atlanta United
Hernández signed with Atlanta United before the 2018 Major League Soccer season. After being loaned to Atlanta United 2 for over half of the season, Hernández made his first team debut vs Real Salt Lake on 22 September 2018 coming on as a substitute in the 73rd minute for George Bello.

Hernández was again loaned to Atlanta United 2 ahead of the 2019 MLS season. On 21 November 2019 the club announced they had declined Hernández's contract option.

Atlético Venezuela

On 8 January 2020 Atlético Venezuela announced they had signed Hernández.

International career
Hernández was called up to the Venezuela under-20 side for the 2017 FIFA U-20 World Cup.

Career statistics

Club

Notes

Honours

International
Venezuela U-20
FIFA U-20 World Cup: Runner-up 2017
South American Youth Football Championship: Third Place 2017

Venezuela U-17
South American Under-17 Football Championship: Runner-Up 2013

References

External links
 

1997 births
Living people
Venezuelan footballers
Venezuelan expatriate footballers
Venezuelan expatriate sportspeople in the United States
Association football defenders
Caracas FC players
Atlanta United FC players
Venezuelan Primera División players
Atlanta United 2 players
USL Championship players
Major League Soccer players
21st-century Venezuelan people